The following lists events that happened during 1911 in China.

Incumbents
Emperor: Xuantong Emperor (2nd year)
Regent: Empress Dowager Longyu

Events

April 
 In April, Zhao Erfeng was appointed as Viceroy of Sichuan by the Government of Great Qing. Before he took office, he was appointed by Wang Renwen. In order to stabilize the situation of Railway Protection Movement, Zhao had jointly requested local officials at various levels to request the central government to change the state-owned policy Of railways, but it was not allowed.
 April 27 - Second Guangzhou Uprising
 April 29 - Establishment of Tsinghua University

May 
 May 8 - the government of Great Qing withdrew the military department and re-established the cabinet. Yikuang is the prime minister of the cabinet. The members are mainly Manchu, they are known as the Royal Cabinet.
 May 9 - The government of Great Qing promulgated the "Railway Nationalization" Act.

September 
 September 7 - In Chengdu, Railway Protection Movement provoked riots.

October 
 10 October - Wuchang Uprising (Xinhai Revolution)
 18 October-1 December - Battle of Yangxia
 20 October - Battle of Changsha

December 
 December 6 - Yuan Shikai asked Empress Dowager Longyu to ask Zaifeng for his resignation as Regent.
 December 29 - Sun Yat-sen was elected as the interim president of the Republic of China by representatives of 17 provinces in Nanjing, China, entered the Republican era.(1911 Republic of China provisional presidential election)

References

 
1910s in China
Years of the 20th century in China